The Florida Marlins' 2003 season was the 11th season for the Major League Baseball (MLB) franchise in the National League. The Marlins were the National League Wild Card winners, the National League Champions, and the World Series Champions. They defeated the New York Yankees in the World Series in six games to win their second World Series championship. The Marlins became the second team in baseball history to win a World Series championship despite being 10 or more games below .500 (as low as 19-29) at some point in the season; the other team was the 1914 Boston Braves.

This was the last Marlins team to make the postseason until 2020.

Offseason
The Marlins pulled off some blockbuster deals during the 2003 off season, the most impressive being that of 10-time Gold Glove winning catcher Iván Rodríguez. They also traded catcher Charles Johnson and outfielder Preston Wilson to the Colorado Rockies for lead-off man Juan Pierre.

 November 16, 2002: Charles Johnson was traded by the Florida Marlins with Vic Darensbourg, Pablo Ozuna, and Preston Wilson to the Colorado Rockies for Juan Pierre, Mike Hampton, and cash (shortly thereafter, Mike Hampton was traded to the Atlanta Braves for Tim Spooneybarger).
 November 12, 2002: Matt Treanor signed as a free agent with the Florida Marlins.
 January 8, 2003: Todd Hollandsworth signed as a free agent with the Florida Marlins.
 January 28, 2003: Iván Rodríguez signed as a free agent with the Florida Marlins.
 February 13, 2003: Al Martin signed as a free agent with the Florida Marlins.
 February 15, 2003: Kevin Millar was purchased by the Boston Red Sox from the Florida Marlins.
 March 28, 2003: Al Martin was released by the Florida Marlins.

Regular season

Opening Day starters
 Josh Beckett – SP
 Luis Castillo – 2B
 Juan Encarnación – RF
 Álex González – SS
 Todd Hollandsworth – LF
 Derrek Lee – 1B
 Mike Lowell – 3B
 Juan Pierre – CF
 Iván Rodríguez – C

Season standings

National League East

Record vs. opponents

Game log

|-bgcolor=ffbbbb
| 1 || March 31 || Phillies || 5–8 || Millwood (1–0) || Beckett (0–1) || Mesa (1) || 37,137 || 0–1 || L1
|-bgcolor=ffbbbb
| 2 || April 2 || Phillies || 2–8 || Wolf (1–0) || Pavano (0–1) || — || 10,534 || 0–2 || L2
|-bgcolor=bbffbb
| 3 || April 3 || Phillies || 8–3 || Redman (1–0) || Padilla (0–1) || — || 14,585 || 1–2 || W1
|-bgcolor=ffbbbb
| 4 || April 4 || @ Braves || 7–12 || Hernandez (1–0) || Nunez (0–1) || Smoltz (1) || 20,642 || 1–3 || L1
|-bgcolor=bbffbb
| 5 || April 5 || @ Braves || 17–1 || Beckett (1–1) || Maddux (0–2) || — || 23,081 || 2–3 || W1 
|-bgcolor=ffbbbb
| 6 || April 6 || @ Braves || 4–13 || Ramirez (1–1) || Penny (0–1) || — || 21,253 || 2–4 || L1
|-bgcolor=ffbbbb
| 7 || April 7 || @ Braves || 0–3 || Ortiz (1–1) || Pavano (0–2) || Smoltz (2) || 19,326 || 2–5 || L2
|-bgcolor=ffbbbb
| 8 || April 8 || Mets || 2–4 || Leiter (2–0) || Redman (1–1) || Benitez (3) || 10,103 || 2–6 || L3
|-bgcolor=bbffbb
| 9 || April 9 || Mets || 3–2 || Looper (1–0) || Stanton (0–1) || — || 10,052 || 3–6 || W1
|-bgcolor=bbffbb
| 10 || April 10 || Mets || 4–3 || Spooneybarger (1–0) || Benitez (0–2) || — || 10,267 || 4–6 || W2
|-bgcolor=bbffbb
| 11 || April 11 || Braves || 7–4 || Penny (1–1) || Ramirez (1–2) || Looper (1) || 12,045 || 5–6 || W3
|-bgcolor=bbffbb
| 12 || April 12 || Braves || 12–5 || Pavano (1–2) || Ortiz (1–2) || — || 25,203 || 6–6 || W4
|-bgcolor=ffbbbb
| 13 || April 13 || Braves || 1–7 || Maddux (1–3) || Redman (1–2) || Smoltz (3) || 21,834 || 6–7 || L1
|-bgcolor=ffbbbb
| 14 || April 14 || @ Phillies || 2–5 || Padilla (2–1) || Burnett (0–1) || Mesa (2) || 13,611 || 6–8 || L2
|-bgcolor=ffbbbb
| 15 || April 15 || @ Phillies || 3–4 || Silva (2–0) || Beckett (1–2) || Mesa (3) || 17,508 || 6–9 || L3
|-bgcolor=bbffbb
| 16 || April 16 || @ Phillies || 3–1 || Penny (2–1) || Myers (0–2) || Looper (2) || 15,167 || 7–9 || W1
|-bgcolor=bbffbb
| 17 || April 17 || @ Phillies || 7–3 || Pavano (2–2) || Millwood (2–1) || — || 13,968 || 8–9 || W2
|-bgcolor=ffbbbb
| 18 || April 18 || @ Mets || 3–6 || Weathers (1–0) || Nunez (0–2) || Benitez (5) || 18,525 || 8–10 || L1
|-bgcolor=bbffbb
| 19 || April 19 || @ Mets || 6–5 || Looper (2–0) || Benitez (0–3) || — || 36,448 || 9–10 || W1
|-bgcolor=ffbbbb
| 20 || April 20 || @ Mets || 4–7 || Glavine (3–1) || Nunez (0–3) || — || 26,245 || 9–11 || L1
|-bgcolor=bbffbb
| 21 || April 22 || Brewers || 4–2 || Almanza (1–0) || de los Santos (0–1) || Looper (3) || 10,115 || 10–11 || W1
|-bgcolor=bbffbb
| 22 || April 23 || Brewers || 5–4  || Almanza (2–0) || Nance (0–1) || — || 9,182 || 11–11 || W2
|-bgcolor=bbffbb
| 23 || April 24 || Brewers || 4–2 || Redman (2–2) || Ritchie (1–2) || — || 9,069 || 12–11 || W3
|-bgcolor=ffbbbb
| 24 || April 25 || Cardinals || 2–9 || Tomko (2–2) || Burnett (0–2) || — || 12,081 || 12–12 || L1
|-bgcolor=bbffbb
| 25 || April 26 || Cardinals || 5–3 || Beckett (2–2) || Kline (0–3) || Looper (4) || 12,286 || 13–12 || W1
|-bgcolor=ffbbbb
| 26 || April 27 || Cardinals || 6–7  || Kline (1–3) || Pavano (2–3) || — || 10,075 || 13–13 || L1
|-bgcolor=ffbbbb
| 27 || April 28 || @ Diamondbacks || 1–7 || Dessens (3–2) || Wayne (0–1) || — || 25,468 || 13–14 || L2
|-bgcolor=bbffbb
| 28 || April 29 || @ Diamondbacks || 7–5 || Redman (3–2) || Kim (1–5) || — || 29,380 || 14–14 || W1
|-bgcolor=ffbbbb
| 29 || April 30 || @ Diamondbacks || 3–7 || Batista (1–2) || Pavano (2–4) || Mantei (4) || 24,306 || 14–15 || L1
|-

|-bgcolor=bbffbb
| 30 || May 1 || @ Diamondbacks || 4–3 || Almanza (3–0) || Villarreal (1–2) || Looper (5) || 25,044 || 15–15 || W1
|-bgcolor=ffbbbb
| 31 || May 2 || @ Astros || 3–4 || Stone (2–0) || Penny (2–2) || Wagner (5) || 22,659 || 15–16 || L1
|-bgcolor=ffbbbb
| 32 || May 3 || @ Astros || 2–5 || Redding (3–2) || Wayne (0–2) || Dotel (2) || 28,188 || 15–17 || L2
|-bgcolor=ffbbbb
| 33 || May 4 || @ Astros || 2–5 || Lidge (3–0) || Spooneybarger (1–1) || Wagner (6) || 31,764 || 15–18 || L3
|-bgcolor=ffbbbb
| 34 || May 6 || Giants || 2–4 || Nathan (3–0) || Almanza (3–1) || Worrell (9) || 11,701 || 15–19 || L4
|-bgcolor=ffbbbb
| 35 || May 7 || Giants || 2–3 || Moss (5–0) || Beckett (2–3) || Worrell (10) || 11,464 || 15–20 || L5
|-bgcolor=ffbbbb
| 36 || May 8 || Giants || 2–3 || Nathan (4–0) || Looper (2–1) || Worrell (11) || 13,812 || 15–21 || L6
|-bgcolor=bbffbb
| 37 || May 9 || Rockies || 5–4 || Looper (3–1) || Speier (2–1) || — || 10,272 || 16–21 || W1
|-bgcolor=ffbbbb
| 38 || May 10 || Rockies || 4–5 || Jennings (3–3) || Tejera (0–1) || Jimenez (8) || 16,543 || 16–22 || L1
|-bgcolor=bbffbb
| 39 || May 11 || Rockies || 7–2 || Pavano (3–4) || Cook (1–3) || — || 9,205 || 17–22 || W1
|-bgcolor=bbffbb
| 40 || May 12 || @ Padres || 6–1 || Levrault (1–0) || Condrey (1–2) || — || 15,869 || 18–22 || W2
|-bgcolor=ffbbbb
| 41 || May 13 || @ Padres || 5–6  || Herges (1–0) || Looper (3–2) || — || 13,203 || 18–23 || L1
|-bgcolor=bbffbb
| 42 || May 14 || @ Padres || 10–3 || Willis (1–0) || Bynum (0–2) || — || 10,935 || 19–23 || W1
|-bgcolor=ffbbbb
| 43 || May 16 || @ Dodgers || 1–2 || Dreifort (3–3) || Almanza (3–2) || Gagne (13) || 47,383 || 19–24 || L1
|-bgcolor=ffbbbb
| 44 || May 17 || @ Dodgers || 1–4 || Perez (3–2) || Tejera (0–2) || Gagne (14) || 38,248 || 19–25 || L2
|-bgcolor=ffbbbb
| 45 || May 18 || @ Dodgers || 1–2 || Nomo (5–4) || Penny (2–3) || Gagne (15) || 43,775 || 19–26 || L3
|-bgcolor=ffbbbb
| 46 || May 20 || @ Expos || 4–6 || Vazquez (4–2) || Willis (1–1) || Biddle (13) || 5,435 || 19–27 || L4
|-bgcolor=ffbbbb
| 47 || May 21 || @ Expos || 2–7 || Vargas (2–1) || Pavano (3–5) || — || 5,282 || 19–28 || L5
|-bgcolor=ffbbbb
| 48 || May 22 || @ Expos || 2–8 || Hernandez (4–2) || Tejera (0–3) || — || 6,249 || 19–29 || L6
|-bgcolor=bbffbb
| 49 || May 23 || @ Reds || 8–4 || Phelps (1–0) || Austin (2–2) || — || 30,596  || 20–29 || W1
|-bgcolor=bbffbb
| 50 || May 24 || @ Reds || 5–4 || Penny (3–3) || Wilson (2–4) || Looper (6) || 41,285 || 21–29 || W2
|-bgcolor=bbffbb
| 51 || May 25 || @ Reds || 6–2 || Willis (2–1) || Graves (3–3) || Looper (7) || 35,073 || 22–29 || W3
|-bgcolor=bbffbb
| 52 || May 26 || Expos || 5–1 || Pavano (4–5) || Vargas (2–2) || — || 8,362 || 23–29 || W4
|-bgcolor=bbbbbb
| – || May 27 || Expos || colspan=8 | Postponed (rain, makeup May 28)
|-bgcolor=bbffbb
| 53 || May 28  || Expos || 4–3 || Phelps (2–0) || Hernandez (4–3) || Looper (8) || N/A || 24–29 || W5
|-bgcolor=bbffbb
| 54 || May 28  || Expos || 6–0 || Tejera (1–3) || Day (4–3) || — || 9,169 || 25–29 || W6
|-bgcolor=ffbbbb
| 55 || May 29 || Expos || 2–3 || Ohka (4–5) || Almanza (3–3) || Biddle (15) || 9,052 || 25–30 || L1
|-bgcolor=ffbbbb
| 56 || May 30 || Reds || 3–4  || White (3–0) || Almanza (3–4) || Williamson (12) || 17,385 || 25–31 || L2
|-bgcolor=bbffbb
| 57 || May 31 || Reds || 3–2 || Willis (3–1) || Graves (3–4) || Looper (9) || 16,190 || 26–31 || W1
|-

|-bgcolor=ffbbbb
| 58 || June 1 || Reds || 6–9 || Sullivan (6–0) || Pavano (4–6) || Williamson (13) || 12,236 || 26–32 || L1
|-bgcolor=bbffbb
| 59 || June 3 || Athletics || 13–2 || Penny (4–3) || Mulder (8–3) || — || 10,195 || 27–32 || W1
|-bgcolor=ffbbbb
| 60 || June 4 || Athletics || 5–6 || Bradford (4–3) || Spooneybarger (1–2) || Foulke (15) || 10,215 || 27–33 || L1
|-bgcolor=bbffbb
| 61 || June 5 || Athletics || 2–0 || Willis (4–1) || Lilly (3–4) || Looper (10) || 10,140 || 28–33 || W1
|-bgcolor=bbffbb
| 62 || June 6 || Angels || 4–1 || Pavano (5–6) || Appier (4–3) || Looper (11) || 13,188 || 29–33 || W2
|-bgcolor=ffbbbb
| 63 || June 7 || Angels || 2–9 || Sele (3–3) || Phelps (2–1) || — || 23,483 || 29–34 || L1
|-bgcolor=ffbbbb
| 64 || June 8 || Angels || 5–8 || Ortiz (6–5) || Penny (4–4) || Percival (8) || 12,620 || 29–35 || L2
|-bgcolor=bbffbb
| 65 || June 10 || @ Brewers || 12–4 || Redman (4–2) || Sheets (6–5) || — || 11,598 || 30–35 || W1
|-bgcolor=bbffbb
| 66 || June 11 || @ Brewers || 6–5 || Willis (5–1) || Franklin (3–5) || Looper (12) || 12,419 || 31–35 || W2
|-bgcolor=ffbbbb
| 67 || June 12 || @ Brewers || 5–6 || Kinney (5–4) || Pavano (5–7) || DeJean (15) || 13,075 || 31–36 || L1
|-bgcolor=bbffbb
| 68 || June 13 || @ Rangers || 8–0 || Penny (5–4) || Mounce (0–1) || — || 26,075 || 32–36 || W1
|-bgcolor=ffbbbb
| 69 || June 14 || @ Rangers || 2–13 || Valdez (6–2) || Phelps (2–2) || — || 37,443 || 32–37 || L1
|-bgcolor=bbffbb
| 70 || June 15 || @ Rangers || 10–4 || Redman (5–2) || Thomson (4–8) || — || 26,021 || 33–37 || W1
|-bgcolor=bbffbb
| 71 || June 16 || Mets || 1–0 || Willis (6–1) || Glavine (5–7) || — || 10,624 || 34–37 || W2
|-bgcolor=ffbbbb
| 72 || June 17 || Mets || 0–5 || Seo (5–2) || Pavano (5–8) || — || 10,359 || 34–38 || L1
|-bgcolor=ffbbbb
| 73 || June 18 || Mets || 5–10 || Leiter (8–3) || Penny (5–5) || Wheeler (1) || 11,326 || 34–39 || L2
|-bgcolor=bbffbb
| 74 || June 19 || Mets || 5–1 || Phelps (3–2) || Bacsik (1–2) || — || 10,400 || 35–39 || W1
|-bgcolor=bbffbb
| 75 || June 20 || Devil Rays || 3–1  || Almanza (4–4) || Levine (2–5) || — || 12,515 || 36–39 || W2
|-bgcolor=bbffbb
| 76 || June 21 || Devil Rays || 2–0  || Willis (7–1) || Standridge (0–2) || — || 15,397 || 37–39 || W3
|-bgcolor=bbffbb
| 77 || June 22 || Devil Rays || 3–2 || Pavano (6–8) || Gonzalez (3–3) || Looper (13) || 10,392 || 38–39 || W4
|-bgcolor=bbffbb
| 78 || June 24 || @ Mets || 8–4 || Penny (6–5) || Leiter (8–4) || Tejera (1) || 22,226 || 39–39 || W5
|-bgcolor=ffbbbb
| 79 || June 25 || @ Mets || 3–6 || Trachsel (6–5) || Redman (5–3) || Benitez (18) || 22,563 || 39–40 || L1
|-bgcolor=bbffbb
| 80 || June 26 || @ Mets || 6–1 || Willis (8–1) || Heilman (0–1) || — || 30,378 || 40–40 || W1
|-bgcolor=ffbbbb
| 81 || June 27 || @ Red Sox || 8–25 || Kim (3–6) || Pavano (6–9) || — || 34,764 || 40–41 || L1
|-bgcolor=bbffbb
| 82 || June 28 || @ Red Sox || 10–9 || Bump (1–0) || Lyon (3–4) || Looper (14) || 34,804 || 41–41 || W1
|-bgcolor=ffbbbb
| 83 || June 29 || @ Red Sox || 7–11 || Lowe (9–3) || Penny (6–6) || — || 34,476 || 41–42 || L1
|-bgcolor=bbffbb
| 84 || June 30 || Braves || 8–1 || Redman (6–3) || Maddux (6–8) || — || 11,254 || 42–42 || W1
|-

|-bgcolor=bbffbb
| 85 || July 1 || Braves || 20–1 || Beckett (3–3) || Hampton (3–5) || — || 13,073 || 43–42 || W2
|-bgcolor=ffbbbb
| 86 || July 2 || Braves || 1–2  || Gryboski (5–3) || Almanza (4–5) ||Smoltz (30) || 30,634 || 43–43 || L1
|-bgcolor=bbffbb
| 87 || July 4 || @ Phillies || 2–1 || Looper (4–2) || Mesa (3–5) || — || 19,690 || 44–43 || W1
|-bgcolor=bbffbb
| 88 || July 5 || @ Phillies || 5–4 || Penny (7–6) || Padilla (7–8) || Looper (15) || 52,110 || 45–43 || W2
|-bgcolor=bbffbb
| 89 || July 6 || @ Phillies || 6–3 || Redman (7–3) || Wolf (9–4) || — || 26,244 || 46–43 || W3
|-bgcolor=ffbbbb
| 90 || July 7 || @ Cubs || 3–6 || Clement (6–7) || Beckett (3–4) || Borowski (17) || 38,662 || 46–44 || L1
|-bgcolor=bbffbb
| 91 || July 8 || @ Cubs || 4–3 || Bump (2–0) || Remlinger (5–3) || Looper (16) || 33,227 || 47–44 || W1
|-bgcolor=ffbbbb
| 92 || July 9 || @ Cubs || 1–5 || Wood (9–6) || Pavano (6–10) || — || 33,054 || 47–45 || L1
|-bgcolor=bbffbb
| 93 || July 11 || @ Expos || 5–4 || Penny (8–6) || Biddle (3–4) || Looper (17) || 7,251 || 48–45 || W1
|-bgcolor=ffbbbb
| 94 || July 12 || @ Expos || 1–7 || Hernandez (9–6) || Redman (7–4) || — || 28,170 || 48–46 || L1
|-bgcolor=bbffbb
| 95 || July 13 || @ Expos || 11–4 || Willis (9–1) || Vargas (6–5) || — || 16,084 || 49–46 || W1
|-bgcolor=#bbbfff
| – || July 15 || colspan="8"|74th All-Star Game in Chicago, IL
|-bgcolor=bbffbb
| 96 || July 18 || Cubs || 6–0 || Redman (8–4) || Clement (7–8) || — || 26,174 || 50–46 || W2
|-bgcolor=ffbbbb
| 97 || July 19 || Cubs || 0–1 || Wood (10–6) || Penny (8–7) || — || 30,432 || 50–47 || L1
|-bgcolor=ffbbbb
| 98 || July 20 || Cubs || 2–16 || Zambrano (7–8) || Willis (9–2) || — || 25,574 || 50–48 || L2
|-bgcolor=bbffbb
| 99 || July 21 || Expos || 4–1 || Beckett (4–4) || Knott (0–1) || — || 10,769 || 51–48 || W1
|-bgcolor=bbffbb
| 100 || July 22 || Expos || 9–1 || Pavano (7–10) || Ohka (7–10) || — || 10,512 || 52–48 || W2
|-bgcolor=bbffbb
| 101 || July 23 || @ Braves || 5–4  || Bump (3–0) || Hodges (3–1) || — || 27,137 || 53–48 || W3
|-bgcolor=ffbbbb
| 102 || July 24 || @ Braves || 2–5 || Ortiz (14–4) || Penny (8–8) || Smoltz (37) || 33,711 || 53–49 || L1
|-bgcolor=bbffbb
| 103 || July 25 || Phillies || 11–5 || Urbina (1–4) || Williams (1–4) || — || 18,106 || 54–49 || W1
|-bgcolor=bbffbb
| 104 || July 26 || Phillies || 10–5 || Beckett (5–4) || Duckworth (3–5) || Looper (18) || 20,545 || 55–49 || W2
|-bgcolor=bbffbb
| 105 || July 27 || Phillies || 7–6 || Urbina (2–4) || Williams (1–5) || — || 12,467 || 56–49 || W3
|-bgcolor=bbffbb
| 106 || July 28 || Diamondbacks || 3–2 || Redman (9–4) || Batista (7–6) || Looper (19) || 10,472 || 57–49 || W4
|-bgcolor=bbffbb
| 107 || July 29 || Diamondbacks || 2–1 || Penny (9–8) || Webb (7–4) || Looper (20) || 11,469 || 58–49 || W5
|-bgcolor=bbffbb
| 108 || July 30 || Diamondbacks || 3–1 || Willis (10–2) || Johnson (1–4) || Looper (21) || 37,735 || 59–49 || W6
|-

|-bgcolor=ffbbbb
| 109 || August 1 || Astros || 1–2 || Redding (8–9) || Beckett (5–5) || Wagner (32) || 12,392 || 59–50 || L1
|-bgcolor=bbffbb
| 110 || August 2 || Astros || 5–2 || Pavano (8–10) || Robertson (10–5) || Looper (22) || 25,206 || 60–50 || W1
|-bgcolor=ffbbbb
| 111 || August 3 || Astros || 1–3 || Fernandez (1–0) || Redman (9–5) || Wagner (33) || 12,262 || 60–51 || L1
|-bgcolor=bbffbb
| 112 || August 5 || @ Cardinals || 4–0 || Penny (10–8) || Williams (14–5) || — || 35,468 || 61–51 || W1
|-bgcolor=bbffbb
| 113 || August 6 || @ Cardinals || 7–3 || Willis (11–2) || Haren (2–3) || — || 31,606 || 62–51 || W2
|-bgcolor=ffbbbb
| 114 || August 7 || @ Cardinals || 0–3 || Tomko (8–7) || Beckett (5–6) || Isringhausen (9) || 31,002 || 62–52 || L1
|-bgcolor=bbffbb
| 115 || August 8 || @ Brewers || 5–3 || Pavano (9–10) || Sheets (10–9) || Looper (23) || 25,022 || 63–52 || W1
|-bgcolor=bbffbb
| 116 || August 9 || @ Brewers || 7–1 || Redman (10–5) || Manning (0–2) || — || 28,488 || 64–52 || W2
|-bgcolor=ffbbbb
| 117 || August 10 || @ Brewers || 4–5 || de los Santos (2–3) || Penny (10–9) || Kolb (6) || 37,521 || 64–53 || L1
|-bgcolor=ffbbbb
| 118 || August 11 || Dodgers || 3–9 || Od. Perez (8–9) || Willis (11–3) || — || 20,288 || 64–54 || L2
|-bgcolor=bbffbb
| 119 || August 12 || Dodgers || 5–4  || Fox (2–2) || Shuey (4–4) || — || 12,025 || 65–54 || W1
|-bgcolor=bbffbb
| 120 || August 13 || Dodgers || 2–1  || Bump (4–0) || Alvarez (0–1) || — || 12,323 || 66–54 || W2
|-bgcolor=ffbbbb
| 121 || August 14 || Dodgers || 4–6 || Brown (12–6) || Redman (10–6) || Gagne (40) || 12,561 || 66–55 || L1
|-bgcolor=bbffbb
| 122 || August 15 || Padres || 10–0 || Penny (11–9) || Ol. Perez (4–6) || — || 18,349 || 67–55 || W1
|-bgcolor=bbffbb
| 123 || August 16 || Padres || 6–3 || Fox (3–2) || Witasick (3–3) || Looper (24) || 26,104 || 68–55 || W2
|-bgcolor=bbffbb
| 124 || August 17 || Padres || 11–7 || Beckett (6–6) || Eaton (7–9) || Tejera (2) || 12,052 || 69–55 || W3
|-bgcolor=ffbbbb
| 125 || August 19 || @ Rockies || 2–10 || Stark (2–1) || Pavano (9–11) || — || 25,889 || 69–56 || L1
|-bgcolor=ffbbbb
| 126 || August 20 || @ Rockies || 3–9 || Vance (1–0) || Redman (10–7) || — || 23,534 || 69–57 || L2
|-bgcolor=ffbbbb
| 127 || August 21 || @ Rockies || 4–5 || Speier (3–1) || Looper (4–3) || — || 23,846 || 69–58 || L3
|-bgcolor=ffbbbb
| 128 || August 22 || @ Giants || 4–6 || Ponson (15–9) || Willis (11–4) || Worrell (26) || 42,244 || 69–59 || L4
|-bgcolor=ffbbbb
| 129 || August 23 || @ Giants || 2–3 || Brower (8–4) || Beckett (6–7) || Worrell (27) || 42,189 || 69–60 || L5
|-bgcolor=bbffbb
| 130 || August 24 || @ Giants || 7–4 || Pavano (10–11) || Reuter (7–4) || — || 41.886 || 70–60 || W1
|-bgcolor=ffbbbb
| 131 || August 26 || @ Pirates || 3–4 || Lincoln (2–4) || Redman (10–8) || Tavarez (3) || 12,219 || 70–61 || L1
|-bgcolor=ffbbbb
| 132 || August 27 || @ Pirates || 0–4 || Wells (6–7) || Penny (11–10) || — || 18,264 || 70–62 || L2
|-bgcolor=ffbbbb
| 133 || August 28 || @ Pirates || 0–5 || Fogg (8–7) || Willis (11–5) || — || 12,679 || 70–63 || L3
|-bgcolor=bbffbb
| 134 || August 29 || Expos || 3–2 || Looper (5–3) || Biddle (4–8) || — || 12,231 || 71–63 || W1
|-bgcolor=bbffbb
| 135 || August 30 || Expos || 4–3 || Pavano (11–11) || Hernandez (14–8) || Looper (25) || 20,724 || 72–63 || W2
|-bgcolor=bbffbb
| 136 || August 31 || Expos || 5–3 || Redman (11–8) || Day (7–6) || Urbina (27) || 11,105 || 73–63 || W3
|-

|-bgcolor=bbffbb
| 137 || September 1 || Expos || 5–2 || Penny (12–10) || Ohka (8–11) || Looper (26) || 12,413 || 74–63 || W4
|-bgcolor=ffbbbb
| 138 || September 2 || Pirates || 2–3 || Wells (7–7) || Willis (11–6) || Tavarez (4) || 10,327 || 74–64 || L1
|-bgcolor=bbffbb
| 139 || September 3 || Pirates || 3–0 || Beckett (7–7) || Fogg (8–8) || Urbina (28) || 11,135 || 75–64 || W1
|-bgcolor=bbffbb
| 140 || September 4 || Pirates || 5–1 || Tejera (2–3) || Torres (5–4) || — || 10,213 || 76–64 || W2
|-bgcolor=ffbbbb
| 141 || September 5 || @ Expos || 2–6 || Hernandez (15–8) || Redman (11–9) || — || 11,509 || 76–65 || L1
|-bgcolor=bbffbb
| 142 || September 6 || @ Expos || 14–4 || Penny (13–10) || Ohka (8–12) || — || 14,570 || 77–65 || W1
|-bgcolor=bbffbb
| 143 || September 7 || @ Expos || 3–1 || Willis (12–6) || Vazquez (12–10) || Looper (27) || 12,647 || 78–65 || W2
|-bgcolor=bbffbb
| 144 || September 8 || @ Mets || 5–0 || Beckett (8–7) || Trachsel (14–9) || — || 15,155 || 79–65 || W3
|-bgcolor=bbffbb
| 145 || September 9 || @ Mets || 3–1 || Urbina (3–4) || Weathers (1–6) || Looper (28) || 29,410 || 80–65 || W4
|-bgcolor=bbffbb
| 146 || September 10 || @ Mets || 7–3 || Redman (12–9) || Seo (8–11) || — || 16,699 || 81–65 || W5
|-bgcolor=bbffbb
| 147 || September 12 || Braves || 5–4 || Looper (6–3) || King (3–3) || — || 25,622 || 82–65 || W6
|-bgcolor=bbffbb
| 148 || September 13 || Braves || 8–3 || Willis (13–6) || Ortiz (19–7) || — || 40,414 || 83–65 || W7
|-bgcolor=ffbbbb
| 149 || September 14 || Braves || 4–8 || Cunnane (2–1) || Looper (6–4) || — || 18,725 || 83–66 || L1
|-bgcolor=ffbbbb
| 150 || September 16 || @ Phillies || 0–14 || Padilla (14–10) || Pavano (11–12) || — || 36,479 || 83–67 || L2
|-bgcolor=bbffbb
| 151 || September 17 || @ Phillies || 11–4 || Redman (13–9) || Myers (14–8) || — || 33,761 || 84–67 || W1
|-bgcolor=ffbbbb
| 152 || September 18 || @ Phillies || 4–5 || Cormier (7–0) || Fox (3–3) || — || 20,950 || 84–68 || L1
|-bgcolor=ffbbbb
| 153 || September 19 || @ Braves || 0–1 || Ortiz (20–7) || Beckett (8–8) || — || 35,942 || 84–69 || L2
|-bgcolor=bbffbb
| 154 || September 20 || @ Braves || 6–5  || Helling (8–8) || Cunnane (2–2) || — || 42,496 || 85–69 || W1
|-bgcolor=ffbbbb
| 155 || September 21 || @ Braves || 0–8 || Maddux (15–11) || Pavano (11–13) || — || 33,827 || 85–70 || L1
|-bgcolor=bbffbb
| 156 || September 22 || @ Braves || 6–3 || Redman (14–9) || Hampton (14–8) || Urbina (29) || 17,345 || 86–70 || W1
|-bgcolor=bbffbb
| 157 || September 23 || Phillies || 5–4 || Tejera (3–3) || Williams (1–7) || Urbina (30) || 25,311 || 87–70 || W2
|-bgcolor=bbffbb
| 158 || September 24 || Phillies || 6–5 || Beckett (9–8) || Myers (14–9) || Urbina (31) || 28,520 || 88–70 || W3
|-bgcolor=bbffbb
| 159 || September 25 || Phillies || 8–4 || Penny (14–10) || Wolf (16–10) || — || 31,935 || 89–70 || W4
|-bgcolor=bbffbb
| 160 || September 26 || Mets || 4–3 || Pavano (12–13) || Heilman (2–7) || Urbina (32) || 33,215 || 90–70 || W5
|-bgcolor=ffbbbb
| 161 || September 27 || Mets || 3–9 || Seo (9–11) || Tejera (3–4) || — || 30,204 || 90–71 || L1
|-bgcolor=bbffbb
| 162 || September 28 || Mets || 4–0 || Willis (14–6) || Griffiths (1–4) || — || 27,529 || 91–71 || W1
|-

Postseason Game Log

|- bgcolor="ffbbbb"
| 1 || September 30 || @ Giants || 0–2 || Schmidt (1–0) || Beckett (0–1) || — || 43,704 || 0–1
|- bgcolor="bbffbb"
| 2 || October 1 || @ Giants || 9–5 || Pavano (1–0) || Nathan (0–1) || — || 43,766 || 1–1
|- bgcolor="bbffbb"
| 3 || October 3 || Giants || 4–3 (11) || Looper (1–0) || Worrell (0–1) || — || 61,488 || 2–1
|- bgcolor="bbffbb"
| 4 || October 4 || Giants || 7–6 || Pavano (2–0) || Rodriguez (0–1) || Urbina (1) || 65,464 || 3–1
|-

|- bgcolor="bbffbb"
| 1 || October 7 || @ Cubs || 9–8 (11) || Urbina (1–0) || Guthrie (0–1) || Looper (1) || 39,567 || 1–0
|- bgcolor="ffbbbb"
| 2 || October 8 || @ Cubs || 3–12 || Prior (1–0) || Penny (0–1) || — || 39,562 || 1–1
|- bgcolor="ffbbbb"
| 3 || October 10 || Cubs || 4–5 (11) || Borowski (1–0) || Tejera (0–1) || Remlinger (1) || 65,115 || 1–2
|- bgcolor="ffbbbb"
| 4 || October 11 || Cubs || 3–8 || Clement (1–0) || Willis (0–1) || — || 65,829 || 1–3
|- bgcolor="bbffbb"
| 5 || October 12 || Cubs || 4–0 || Beckett (1–0) || Zambrano (0–1) || — || 65,279 || 2–3
|- bgcolor="bbffbb"
| 6 || October 14 || @ Cubs || 8–3 || Fox (1–0) || Prior (1–1) || — || 39,577 || 3–3
|- bgcolor="bbffbb"
| 7 || October 15 || @ Cubs || 9–6 || Penny (1–1) || Wood (0–1) || Urbina (1) || 39,574 || 4–3
|-

|- bgcolor="bbffbb"
| 1 || October 18 || @ Yankees || 3–2 || Penny (1–0) || Wells (0–1) || Urbina (1) || 55,769 || 1–0
|- bgcolor="ffbbbb"
| 2 || October 19 || @ Yankees || 1–6 || Pettitte (1–0) || Redman (0–1) || — || 55,750 || 1–1
|- bgcolor="ffbbbb"
| 3 || October 21 || Yankees || 1–6 || Mussina (1–0) || Beckett (0–1) || Rivera (1) || 65,731 || 1–2
|- bgcolor="bbffbb"
| 4 || October 22 || Yankees || 4–3 (12) || Looper (1–0) || Weaver (0–1) || — || 65,934 || 2–2
|- bgcolor="bbffbb"
| 5 || October 23 || Yankees || 6–4 || Penny (2–0) || Contreras (0–1) || Urbina (2) || 65,975 || 3–2
|- bgcolor="bbffbb"
| 6 || October 25 || @ Yankees || 2–0 || Beckett (1–1) || Pettitte (1–1) || — || 55,773 || 4–2
|-

Sluggish start
Jeff Torborg, the manager at the start of the season, led the team to a 16-22 start. Adding to that, their three top pitchers A. J. Burnett, Josh Beckett and Mark Redman, had each endured injuries that season, but Beckett and Redman were able to return to finish the rest of 2003. On May 11, Torborg was fired and replaced with Jack McKeon, a 72-year-old who began his major league managerial career in 1973 with the Kansas City Royals.

Midseason acquisitions
 Miguel Cabrera – 3B → called up from the AA Carolina Mudcats
 Jeff Conine – 1B → acquired from Baltimore in exchange for two minor league players.
 Dontrelle Willis – LHP → called up from the Mudcats.
 Ugueth Urbina – RHP → acquired from Texas in exchange for Adrián González and two other minor league players.
 Aaron Small (RHP) signed as a free agent.

Roster

Player stats

Batting

Starters by position
Note: Pos = Position; G = Games played; AB = At bats; H = Hits; Avg. = Batting average; HR = Home runs; RBI = Runs batted in

Other batters
Note: G = Games played; AB = At bats; H = Hits; Avg. = Batting average; HR = Home runs; RBI = Runs batted in

Pitching

Starting pitchers
Note: G = Games pitched; GS = Games started; IP = Innings pitched; W = Wins; L = Losses; ERA = Earned run average; SO = Strikeouts

Other pitchers
Note: G = Games pitched; IP = Innings pitched; W = Wins; L = Losses; ERA = Earned run average; SO = Strikeouts

Relief pitchers
Note: G = Games pitched; W = Wins; L = Losses; SV = Saves; ERA = Earned run average; SO = Strikeouts

Postseason
With a 4–3 win over the New York Mets on September 26, the Marlins clinched their second wildcard in team history, and finishing with an overall record of 91–71.

National League Division Series

The Marlins won the Division Series over the heavily favored defending National League champion San Francisco Giants. The series ended with a play at the plate with catcher Iván Rodríguez prevailing over Giants first baseman J. T. Snow. Coupled with a perfect throw from Conine and an amazing catch from Rodríguez, Snow was attempting to score by using a football type bulldozing move, but Rodríguez held on and the Marlins won, marking the first time that a post-season series ended with the potential tying run being thrown out at home plate.

NLCS

The 2003 National League Championship Series is arguably one of the most famous (or infamous) post-season series in MLB history. On one side, the Florida Marlins, the miracle who, just a few months before, were at the cellar of the NL. On the other side, the Chicago Cubs, the "lovable losers", who, for the first time in a long time, were so close to victory. The Cubs jumped to a quick 3 games to 1 lead including 2 out of the 3 games in Miami, and were the sure favorites to take the series when it shifted back to Chicago. In Game Five, an absolutely stellar performance by Josh Beckett brought the series back to Chicago, back to Wrigley Field, where the home team has always had the advantage. With the Cubs needing to win only one game, and having studs Mark Prior and Kerry Wood on the hill those two games, most people thought the Marlins hope was over. In Game Six, the Cubs enjoyed a comfortable 3-0 lead with one out in the 8th Inning, when it all fell apart, and the Marlins went on to win the game, tying the series. This was the game of the Steve Bartman incident. In Game Seven, Brad Penny drove it home for the Fish, clinching their second pennant in 6 years.

2003 World Series

In the World Series, the underdog Marlins prevailed over the Yankees, 4 games to 2. This World Series marked the 100th anniversary of the annual event, although because there had not been a World Series played in what would have been its second year (1904), and the cancellation of all post-season play as a result of the strike in 1994, it was only the 99th World Series played. Josh Beckett was named the World Series MVP.

Quote

Farm system

LEAGUE CHAMPIONS: Carolina

References

External links
2003 Florida Marlins at Baseball Almanac
Florida Marlins at Baseball Almanac
2003 Florida Marlins at Baseball Reference

Miami Marlins seasons
Florida Marlins season
National League champion seasons
World Series champion seasons
Florida Marlins